Association Sportive de Panazol is a football club based in Panazol, France. As of the 2021–22 season, it competes in the Régional 2, the seventh tier of French football. The club's colours are yellow and blue.

In the 2021–22 Coupe de France, Panazol qualified for the round of 64 for the first time in the club's history following a win on penalties over Angoulême. They were eliminated in the following round following a loss to Vitré on penalties.

References 

Sport in Haute-Vienne
Football clubs in Nouvelle-Aquitaine